Ismo Lehkonen (born February 1, 1962) is a Finnish former professional ice hockey player. He is currently the head coach of the TUTO Hockey in the Finnish Mestis. His son Artturi Lehkonen is a professional hockey player for the Colorado Avalanche of the National Hockey League.

Lehkonen was the head coach of HIFK of the Finnish SM-liiga from 1999 to 2001. On January 23, 2015, he was named head coach of the Estonia men's national ice hockey team, replacing Sakari Pietila.

A sometime commentator for Finnish broadcaster Yle, he covered the 2022 Stanley Cup Finals in-person, observing his son Artturi win the Stanley Cup.

References

External links

1962 births
Living people
Finnish ice hockey coaches
Finnish ice hockey forwards
HPK players
Jokerit players
Ice hockey people from Helsinki